The Tenth Municipality (In Italian: Decima Municipalità or Municipalità 10) is one of the ten boroughs in which the Italian city of Naples is divided.

Geography
The municipality, part of the area of Campi Flegrei, is located in the western suburb of the city and borders with Pozzuoli.

Its territory includes the zones of Agnano, Nisida, Coroglio and Astroni.

Administrative division
The Tenth Municipality is divided into 2 quarters:

References

External links
 Municipalità 10 page on Naples website

Municipality 10